Jordi Xammar Hernández (born 2 December 1993) is a Spanish sailor. Xammar and Nicolás Rodríguez won the bronze medal in the men's 470 event at the 2020 Summer Olympics.
Previously, Xammar and Joan Herp placed 12th in the men's 470 event at the 2016 Summer Olympics.

He skippered the Spanish entry in the 2017 Youth America's Cup and also a wildcard entry in the 2017 Extreme Sailing Series.

References

External links
 
 Jordi Xammar Hernández at Comité Olímpico Español 
  

1993 births
Living people
Spanish male sailors (sport)
Extreme Sailing Series sailors
420 class world champions
470 class world champions
World champions in sailing for Spain
Olympic sailors of Spain
Sailors at the 2016 Summer Olympics – 470
Sailors at the 2020 Summer Olympics – 470
Medalists at the 2020 Summer Olympics
Olympic medalists in sailing
Olympic bronze medalists for Spain
Sportspeople from Barcelona